Leirinmore is a crofting township in the parish of Durness on the northern coastline of Scotland, in Sutherland, Scottish Highlands. It is in the Scottish council area of Highland. Smoo Cave is located close to Leirinmore.

References

See also
Smoo Cave

Populated places in Sutherland
Leirinmore